Minerva, Archaeology and Ancient art, is a bi-monthly magazine publishing features on exhibitions, excavations, and museums, interviews, news items, and book reviews.

History and profile
Minerva was established in 1990 by Jerome Eisenberg.  It contains articles by experts on the ancient art and archaeology of Egypt and the Middle East, the Graeco-Roman world and the Mediterranean, the Near East, the Far East, Scandinavia, and North and South America.

In 2009 Minerva was purchased by the Mougins Museum of Classical Art, and its subject matter was expanded to include art and the arts influenced and inspired by the ancient world, including architecture, opera, music, film and literature.

In 2020 the magazine was purchased by  Current Publishing.

References

External links
 

Archaeology magazines
Bi-monthly magazines published in the United Kingdom
English-language magazines
Magazines established in 1990